Wang Xuelan (born 1 February 1996) is a Chinese biathlete. She was born in Tonghua. She represented China at the Biathlon World Championships 2016.

References

1996 births
Living people
Chinese female biathletes
People from Tonghua
Sport shooters from Jilin
Skiers from Jilin